General Gabriele D'Annunzio, Prince of Montenevoso  (12 March 1863 – 1 March 1938), sometimes written d'Annunzio, was an Italian poet, playwright, orator, journalist, aristocrat, and Royal Italian Army officer during World War I. He occupied a prominent place in Italian literature from 1889 to 1910 and later political life from 1914 to 1924. He was often referred to under the epithets Il Vate ("the Poet"), or Il Profeta ("the Prophet").

D'Annunzio was associated with the Decadent movement in his literary works, which interplayed closely with French symbolism and British aestheticism. Such works represented a turn against the naturalism of the preceding romantics and was both sensuous and mystical. He came under the influence of Friedrich Nietzsche which would find outlets in his literary and later political contributions. His affairs with several women, including Eleonora Duse and Luisa Casati, received public attention.

During the First World War, perception of D'Annunzio in Italy transformed from literary figure into a national war hero. He was associated with the elite Arditi storm troops of the Italian Army and took part in actions such as the Flight over Vienna. As part of an Italian nationalist reaction against the Paris Peace Conference of 1919, he set up the short-lived Italian Regency of Carnaro in Fiume with himself as Duce. The Charter of Carnaro made music the fundamental principle of the state, which was corporatist in nature. Though D'Annunzio preached Italian ultranationalism and never called himself a fascist, he has been credited with partially inventing Italian fascism, as both his ideas and aesthetics were an influence upon Benito Mussolini.

Biography

Early life

D'Annunzio was born in the township of Pescara, in the region of Abruzzo, the son of a wealthy landowner and mayor of the town, Francesco Paolo Rapagnetta D'Annunzio (1831–1893) and his wife Luisa de Benedictis (1839-1917). His father was born as Francesco Paolo Rapagnetta (the surname of his single mother), but at the age of 13 was adopted by a childless rich uncle, Antonio D'Annunzio. Legend has it that he was initially baptized Gaetano and given the name of Gabriele later in childhood, because of his angelic looks, a story that has largely been disproven.

His precocious talent was recognised early in life, and he was sent to school at the Liceo Cicognini in Prato, Tuscany. He published his first poetry while still at school at the age of sixteen — a small volume of verses called Primo Vere (1879). Influenced by Giosuè Carducci's Odi barbare, he posed side by side some almost brutal imitations of Lorenzo Stecchetti, the fashionable poet of Postuma, with translations from the Latin. His verse was so distinguished that literary critic Giuseppe Chiarini, upon reading them, brought the unknown youth before the public in an enthusiastic article.

In 1881 D'Annunzio entered the University of Rome La Sapienza, where he became a member of various literary groups, including Cronaca Bizantina, and wrote articles and criticism for local newspapers. In those university years he started to promote Italian irredentism.

Literary work

He published Canto novo (1882), Terra vergine (1882), L'intermezzo di rime (1883), Il libro delle vergini (1884) and the greater part of the short stories that were afterwards collected under the general title of San Pantaleone (1886). Canto novo contains poems full of pulsating youth and the promise of power, some descriptive of the sea and some of the Abruzzese landscape, commented on and completed in prose by Terra vergine, the latter a collection of short stories dealing in radiant language with the peasant life of the author's native province. Intermezzo di rime is the beginning of D'Annunzio's second and characteristic manner. His conception of style was new, and he chose to express all the most subtle vibrations of voluptuous life. Both style and contents began to startle his critics; some who had greeted him as an enfant prodige rejected him as a perverter of public morals, whilst others hailed him as one bringing a breath of fresh air and an impulse of new vitality into the somewhat prim, lifeless work hitherto produced.

Meanwhile, the review of D'Annunzio publisher Angelo Sommaruga perished in the midst of scandal, and his group of young authors found itself dispersed. Some entered the teaching career and were lost to literature, others threw themselves into journalism.

Gabriele D'Annunzio took this latter course, and joined the staff of the Tribuna, under the pseudonym of "Duca Minimo". Here he wrote Il libro d'Isotta (1886), a love poem, in which for the first time he drew inspiration adapted to modern sentiments and passions from the rich colours of the Renaissance.

Il libro d'Isotta is interesting also, because in it one can find most of the germs of his future work, just as in Intermezzo melico and in certain ballads and sonnets one can find descriptions and emotions which later went to form the aesthetic contents of Il piacere, Il trionfo della morte and Elegie romane (1892).

D'Annunzio's first novel Il Piacere (1889, translated into English as The Child of Pleasure) was followed in 1891 by Giovanni Episcopo, and in 1892 by L'innocente (The Intruder). These three novels made a profound impression. L'innocente, admirably translated into French by Georges Herelle, brought its author the notice and applause of foreign critics. His next work, Il trionfo della morte (The Triumph of Death) (1894), was followed soon by Le vergini delle rocce (The Maidens of the Rocks) (1896) and Il fuoco (The Flame of Life) (1900); the latter is in its descriptions of Venice perhaps the most ardent glorification of a city existing in any language.

D'Annunzio's poetic work of this period, in most respects his finest, is represented by Il Poema Paradisiaco (1893), the Odi navali (1893), a superb attempt at civic poetry, and Laudi (1900).

A later phase of D'Annunzio's work is his dramatic production, represented by Il sogno di un mattino di primavera (1897), a lyrical fantasia in one act, and his Città Morta (The Dead City) (1898), written for Sarah Bernhardt. In 1898 he wrote his Sogno di un pomeriggio d'autunno and La Gioconda; in the succeeding year La gloria, an attempt at contemporary political tragedy which met with no success, probably because of the audacity of the personal and political allusions in some of its scenes; and then Francesca da Rimini (1901), based on an episode from Dante Alighieri's Inferno; a perfect reconstruction of medieval atmosphere and emotion, magnificent in style, and declared by an authoritative Italian critic – Edoardo Boutet – to be the first real, if imperfect, tragedy ever given to the Italian theatre. It was adapted by Tito Ricordi to become the libretto for the opera Francesca da Rimini by Riccardo Zandonai, which premiered in 1914.

In 1883, D'Annunzio married Maria Hardouin di Gallese, and had three sons, Mario (1884-1964), Gabriele Maria "Gabriellino" (1886-1945) and Ugo Veniero (1887-1945), but the marriage ended in 1891. In 1894, he began a love affair with the actress Eleonora Duse which became a cause célèbre. He provided leading roles for her in his plays of the time such as La città morta (1898) and Francesca da Rimini (1901), but the tempestuous relationship finally ended in 1910. After meeting the Marchesa Luisa Casati in 1903, he began a lifelong turbulent on again-off again affair with Luisa, that lasted until a few years before his death.

In 1897, D'Annunzio was elected to the Chamber of Deputies for a three-year term, where he sat as an independent. By 1910, his daredevil lifestyle had forced him into debt, and he fled to France to escape his creditors. There he collaborated with composer Claude Debussy on a musical play, Le Martyre de saint Sébastien (The Martyrdom of St Sebastian), 1911, written for Ida Rubinstein. The Vatican reacted by placing all of his works in the Index of Forbidden Books. The work was not successful as a play, but it has been recorded in adapted versions several times, notably by Pierre Monteux (in French), Leonard Bernstein (sung in French, acted in English), and Michael Tilson Thomas (in French). In 1912 and 1913, D'Annunzio worked with opera composer Pietro Mascagni, writing the libretto for the opera Parisina, staying sometimes in a house rented by the composer in Bellevue, near Paris. D'Annunzio insisted that the entire, long libretto should be set to music, which eventually meant that the work was too long for audiences of the time, and required the entire last act to be removed.

In 1901, D'Annunzio and Ettore Ferrari, the Grand Master of the Grand Orient of Italy, founded the Università Popolare di Milano (Popular University of Milan), located in via Ugo Foscolo. D'Annunzio held the inaugural speech and subsequently became an associated professor and a lecturer in the same institution.

D'Annunzio was a Grand Master of the Scottish Rite Great Lodge of Italy which in 1908 had separated from the Grand Orient of Italy. Subsequently, he adhered to the mystic and philosophic movimento known as Martinism, collaborating in Fiume with other 33rd degree Scottish Rite Freemasons and occultists like Alceste De Ambris, Sante Ceccherini and Marco Egidio Allegri. The Masonic initiation of D'Annunzio his testified by the choice of Masonic symbols for the flag of the Regence of Carnaro like the Ouroboros and the seven stars of the Ursa Major.

World War I

After the start of World War I, D'Annunzio returned to Italy and made public speeches in favor of Italy's entry on the side of the Triple Entente. Since taking a flight with Wilbur Wright in 1908, D'Annunzio had been interested in aviation. With the war beginning he volunteered and achieved further celebrity as a fighter pilot, losing the sight of an eye in a flying accident.

In February 1918, he took part in a daring, if militarily irrelevant, raid on the harbour of Bakar (known in Italy as La beffa di Buccari, lit. the Bakar Mockery), helping to raise the spirits of the Italian public, still battered by the Caporetto disaster. On 9 August 1918, as commander of the 87th fighter squadron "La Serenissima", he organized one of the great feats of the war, leading nine planes in a 700-mile round trip to drop propaganda leaflets on Vienna. This is called in Italian "il Volo su Vienna", "the Flight over Vienna".

Fiume

The war strengthened his ultra-nationalist and irredentist views, and he campaigned widely for Italy to assume a role alongside her wartime allies as a first-rate European power. Angered by the proposed handing over of the city of Fiume (now Rijeka in Croatia) whose population, outside the suburbs, was mostly Italian, at the Paris Peace Conference, on 12 September 1919, he led the seizure by 2,000 Italian nationalist irregulars of the city, forcing the withdrawal of the inter-Allied (American, British and French) occupying forces. The plotters sought to have Italy annex Fiume, but were denied. Instead, Italy initiated a blockade of Fiume while demanding that the plotters surrender.

D'Annunzio then declared Fiume an independent state, the Italian Regency of Carnaro; the Charter of Carnaro foreshadowed much of the later Italian Fascist system, with himself as "Duce" (leader). Some elements of the Royal Italian Navy, such as the destroyer Espero joined up with D'Annunzio's local forces. He attempted to organize an alternative to the League of Nations for (selected) oppressed nations of the world (such as the Irish, whom D'Annunzio attempted to arm in 1920), and sought to make alliances with various separatist groups throughout the Balkans (especially groups of Italians, though also some Slavic and Albanian groups), although without much success. D'Annunzio ignored the Treaty of Rapallo and declared war on Italy itself, only finally surrendering the city on 29 December 1920 after a bombardment by the Italian navy and five days of fighting.

Later life

After the Fiume episode, D'Annunzio retired to his home on Lake Garda and spent his latter years writing and campaigning. Although D'Annunzio had a strong influence on the ideology of Benito Mussolini, he never became directly involved in fascist government politics in Italy. In 1922, shortly before the march on Rome, he was pushed out of a window by an unknown assailant, or perhaps simply slipped and fell out himself while intoxicated. He survived but was badly injured, and recovered only after Mussolini had been appointed Prime Minister.

In 1924 he was ennobled by King Victor Emmanuel III and given the hereditary title of Prince of Montenevoso (Italian: Principe di Montenevoso). In 1937 he was made president of the Royal Academy of Italy. D'Annunzio died in 1938 of a stroke, at his home in Gardone Riviera. He was given a state funeral by Mussolini and was interred in a magnificent tomb constructed of white marble at Il Vittoriale degli Italiani.

His son Gabriellino D'Annunzio became a film director. His 1921 film The Ship was based on a novel by his father. In 1924, he co-directed the historical epic Quo Vadis, an expensive failure, before retiring from filmmaking.

Politics

D'Annunzio is often seen as a precursor of the ideals and techniques of Italian fascism. His political ideals emerged in Fiume when he coauthored a constitution with syndicalist Alceste de Ambris, the Charter of Carnaro. De Ambris provided the legal and political framework, to which D'Annunzio added his skills as a poet. De Ambris was the leader of a group of Italian seamen who had mutinied and then given their vessel to the service of D'Annunzio. The constitution established a corporatist state, with nine corporations to represent the different sectors of the economy (workers, employers, professionals), and a tenth (D'Annunzio's invention) to represent the "superior" human beings (heroes, poets, prophets, supermen). The Carta also declared that music was the fundamental principle of the state.

D'Annunzio, the de facto dictator of Fiume, maintained control through what has been described as a "new and dangerously potent politics of spectacle". It was this culture of dictatorship that Benito Mussolini imitated and learned from D'Annunzio. D'Annunzio has been described as the John the Baptist of Italian Fascism, as virtually the entire ritual of Fascism was invented by D'Annunzio during his occupation of Fiume and his leadership of the Italian Regency of Carnaro. These included the balcony address, the Roman salute, the cries of "Eia, eia, eia! Alala!" taken from the Achilles's cry in the Iliad, the dramatic and rhetorical dialogue with the crowd, the use of religious symbols in new secular settings, as well as blackshirted followers (the Arditi) with their disciplined, bestial responses and strongarm repression of dissent. He was even said to have originated the practice of forcibly dosing opponents with large amounts of castor oil, a very effective laxative, to humiliate, disable or kill them, a practice which became a common tool of Mussolini's blackshirts.

D'Annunzio advocated an expansionist Italian foreign policy and applauded the invasion of Ethiopia.

Rivalry with Mussolini

As John Whittam notes in his essay "Mussolini and The Cult of the Leader":

This famous poet, novelist and war hero was a self-proclaimed Superman. He was the outstanding interventionist in May 1915 and his dramatic exploits during the war won him national and international acclaim. In September 1919 he gathered together his 'legions' and captured the disputed seaport of Fiume. He held it for over a year and it was he who popularised the black shirts, the balcony speeches, the promulgation of ambitious charters and the entire choreography of street parades and ceremonies. He even planned a march on Rome. One historian had rightly described him as the 'First Duce' and Mussolini must have heaved a sigh of relief when he was driven from Fiume in December 1920 and his followers were dispersed. But he remained a threat to Mussolini and in 1921 Fascists like Balbo seriously considered turning to him for leadership.

In contrast Mussolini vacillated from left to right at this time. Although Mussolini's fascism was heavily influenced by the Carta del Carnaro, the constitution for Fiume written by Alceste De Ambris and D'Annunzio, neither wanted to play an active part in the new movement, both refusing when asked by Fascist supporters to run in the elections of 15 May 1921. Before the March on Rome, De Ambris even went so far as to depict the Fascist movement as: "a filthy pawn in Mister Giolitti's game of chess, and made out of the least dignified section of the bourgeoisie".

D'Annunzio was seriously injured when he fell out of a window on 13 August 1922; subsequently the planned "meeting for national pacification" with Francesco Saverio Nitti and Mussolini was cancelled. The incident was never explained and is considered by some historians an attempt to murder him, motivated by his popularity. Despite D'Annunzio's retreat from active public life after this event, the Duce still found it necessary to regularly dole out funds to D'Annunzio as a bribe for not re-entering the political arena. When asked about this by a close friend, Mussolini purportedly stated: "When you have a rotten tooth you have two possibilities open to you: either you pull the tooth or you fill it with gold. With D'Annunzio I have chosen for the latter treatment."

Nonetheless, D'Annunzio kept attempting to intervene in politics almost until his death in 1938. He wrote to Mussolini in 1933 to try to convince him not to ally with Hitler. In 1934, he tried to disrupt the relationship between Hitler and Mussolini after their first meeting, even writing a satirical pamphlet about Hitler. In September 1937, D'Annunzio met with Mussolini at the Verona train station to try to convince him to leave the Axis alliance.

Literature

At the height of his success, D'Annunzio was celebrated for the originality, power and decadence of his writing. Although his work had immense impact across Europe, and influenced generations of Italian writers, his fin de siècle works are now little known, and his literary reputation has always been clouded by nationalistic ideals,and he had his strong detractors. A New York Times review in 1898 of his novel The Intruder referred to him as "evil", "entirely selfish and corrupt". Three weeks into its December 1901 run at the Teatro Constanzi in Rome, his tragedy Francesca da Rimini was banned by the censor on grounds of morality.

A prolific writer, his novels in Italian include Il piacere (The Child of Pleasure, 1889), Il trionfo della morte (The Triumph of Death, 1894), and Le vergini delle rocce (The Maidens of the Rocks, 1896). He wrote the screenplay to the feature film Cabiria (1914) based on episodes from the Second Punic War. D'Annunzio's literary creations were strongly influenced by the French Symbolist school, and contain episodes of striking violence and depictions of abnormal mental states interspersed with gorgeously imagined scenes. One of D'Annunzio's most significant novels, scandalous in its day, is Il fuoco (The Flame of Life) of 1900, in which he portrays himself as the Nietzschean Superman Stelio Effrena, in a fictionalized account of his love affair with Eleonora Duse. His short stories showed the influence of Guy de Maupassant. He was also associated with the Italian noblewoman Luisa Casati, an influence on his novels and one of his mistresses.

The 1911 Encyclopædia Britannica wrote of him:
The work of d' Annunzio, although by many of the younger generation injudiciously and extravagantly admired, is almost the most important literary work given to Italy since the days when the great classics welded her varying dialects into a fixed language. The psychological inspiration of his novels has come to him from many sources—French, Russian, Scandinavian, German—and in much of his earlier work there is little fundamental originality.

His creative power is intense and searching, but narrow and personal; his heroes and heroines are little more than one same type monotonously facing a different problem at a different phase of life. But the faultlessness of his style and the wealth of his language have been approached by none of his contemporaries, whom his genius has somewhat paralysed. In his later work [meaning as of 1911], when he begins drawing his inspiration from the traditions of bygone Italy in her glorious centuries, a current of real life seems to run through the veins of his personages. And the lasting merit of D'Annunzio, his real value to the literature of his country, consists precisely in that he opened up the closed mine of its former life as a source of inspiration for the present and of hope for the future, and created a language, neither pompous nor vulgar, drawn from every source and district suited to the requirements of modern thought, yet absolutely classical, borrowed from none, and, independently of the thought it may be used to express, a thing of intrinsic beauty. As his sight became clearer and his purpose strengthened, as exaggerations, affectations, and moods dropped away from his conceptions, his work became more and more typical Latin work, upheld by the ideal of an Italian Renaissance.

In Italy some of his poetic works remain popular, most notably his poem "La pioggia nel pineto" (The Rain in the Pinewood), which exemplifies his linguistic virtuosity as well as the sensuousness of his poetry. His work was part of the literature event in the art competition at the 1912 Summer Olympics.

Museums

D'Annunzio's life and work are commemorated in a museum, Il Vittoriale degli Italiani (The Shrine of Italian Victories). He planned and developed it himself, adjacent to his villa at Gardone Riviera on the southwest bank of Lake Garda, between 1923 and his death. Now a national monument, it is a complex of military museum, library, literary and historical archive, theatre, war memorial and mausoleum. The museum preserves his torpedo boat MAS 96 and the SVA-5 aircraft he flew over Vienna.

His birthplace is also open to the public as a museum, Birthplace of Gabriele D'Annunzio Museum in Pescara.

Works

Novels

Il Piacere (The Child of Pleasure, 1889)
Giovanni Episcopo (1891)
L'innocente (The Intruder (UK) or The Victim (US)) (1892)
Il trionfo della morte (The Triumph of Death, 1894)
Le vergini delle rocce (The Maidens of the Rocks, 1895)
Il fuoco (The Flame of Life: A Novel, 1900)
Forse che sì forse che no (Maybe Yes, Maybe No, 1910)

Tragedies

La città morta (The Dead City: a Tragedy, 1899)
La Gioconda (Gioconda, 1899)
Francesca da Rimini (1902) 
L'Etiopia in fiamme (1904)
La figlia di Jorio (The Daughter of Jorio, 1904)
La fiaccola sotto il moggio (The Torch Under the Bushel, 1905)
La nave (1908).
Fedra (1909)

Short story collections

 La Riscossa (1918), Bestetti e Tumminelli Edizioni d'Arte, First Edition
Terra vergine (1882)
Le novelle della Pescara (1884–1886)

Poetry collections

Primo vere (1879)
Canto novo (1882)
Poema paradisiaco (1893)
The five books of Laudi del cielo, del mare, della terra e degli eroi (1903–1912)
Maia (Canto Amebeo della Guerra)
Elettra
Alcyone
Merope
Asterope (La Canzone del Quarnaro)
Ode alla nazione serba (1914)

Autobiographical works

La Leda senza cigno
Notturno
Le faville del maglio
Le cento e cento e cento e cento pagine del Libro Segreto di Gabriele D'Annunzio tentato di morire o Libro Segreto (as Angelo Cocles)

His epistolary work, Solus ad solam, was published posthumously.

Filmography
Cabiria, directed by Giovanni Pastrone (1914) – screenplay

Films about Gabriele D'Annunzio
D'Annunzio, directed by Sergio Nasca (1985) – about the romantic relationships in the life of the poet
The Bad Poet, directed by Vincenzo Jodice (2020) – about the poet's last years

Legacy

D'Annunzio University in Chieti and Pescara is named after him.
The Brescia Airport is named after him.
The Chilean poetess Lucila Godoy Alcayaga, 1945 Nobel Prize in Literature, took the first name of her pseudonym, Gabriela Mistral, in his honour.
Ernesto Giménez Caballero was given the nickname the "Spanish D'Annunzio".
The play Tamara is based on his meeting with the painter Tamara de Lempicka.
Luchino Visconti's last film, The Innocent, is based on d'Annunzio's novel.

See also
 Maurice Barrès, a friend and literary-political kindred spirit of D'Annunzio
 Tom Antongini, D'Annunzio's private secretary for more than thirty years
 The Pike: Gabriele D'Annunzio, Poet, Seducer and Preacher of War, a modern reappraisal of his life and work

Notes

References
 

Attribution

Further reading
 
 Antongini, Tommaso. D'Annunzio (William Heinemann, 1938): the author was his private secretary
 Bonadeo, Alfredo. D'Annunzio and the Great War (Fairleigh Dickinson University Press, 1995)
 Gabriele d'Annunzio: The Collection of Poems in English. LiteraryJoint Press (2019)
 
 Galbo, Joseph. "A Decadence Baedeker: D’Annunzio’s The Triumph of Death." The European Legacy 22.1, 2017. DOI: 10.1080/10848770.2016.1239452)
 Galbo, Joseph. "Sex, geography, and death: metropolis and empire in a Fascist writer." Environment and Planning B: Society and Space (vol.14 (1) 1996, pages 35–58. Academia.)
 Gilmour, David. "He Dared the Undarable" The New York Review of Books 6 March 2014, pp. 21–22.
 Hamilton, Alastair. The Appeal of Fascism: A Study of Intellectuals and Fascism 1919–1945 (London, 1971)
 Hughes-Hallett, Lucy. Gabriele d'Annunzio: Poet, Seducer, and Preacher of War (2013) Published in England as The Pike: Gabriele D'Annunzio, Poet, Seducer and Preacher of War (2013)
 Ledeen, Michael A. D'Annunzio: The First Duce
 Pireddu, Nicoletta. Antropologi alla corte della bellezza. Decadenza ed economia simbolica nell'Europa fin de siècle (Verona, Fiorini, 2002)
 Pireddu, Nicoletta. "Gabriele D'Annunzio: The art of squandering and the economy of sacrifice,” The Question of the Gift. Essays Across Disciplines, ed. by Mark Osteen (London and New York: Routledge, 2002): 172–190.
 Pireddu, Nicoletta. “’Il divino pregio del dono’: Andrea Sperelli's economy of pleasures,” Annali d’italianistica, 15, 1997: 175–201.
 Rees, Philip, editor. Biographical Dictionary of the Extreme Right Since 1890 (1991)
 Rhodes, Anthony. D'Annunzio: The Poet as Superman
 Valesio, Paolo. Gabriele D'Annunzio: The Dark Flame (trans. by Marilyn Migiel)
 Veronesi, Matteo. Il critico come artista dall'estetismo agli ermetici. D'Annunzio, Croce, Serra, Luzi e altri (Bologna, Azeta Fastpress, 2006)
 Woodhouse, J.R. Gabriele D'Annunzio: Defiant Archangel (2001)

External links

 The Charter of Carnaro 
 
 
 
 
 Gabrieledannunzio.it
 Gabrieledannunzio.net
 Vittoriale.it
 Wilcoxm, Vanda. D'Annunzio, Gabriele. In the International Encyclopedia of the First World War
 Gabriele D'annunzio
 Casa D'Annunzio
 Il Vittoriale
 Per non dormire Eleganze notturne al Vittoriale
 Eleganze notturne al Vittoriale
 Decennale di Fiume
 Stamp Fiume
 Epistolario D'Annunzio Debussy
 
 

 
1863 births
1938 deaths
19th-century Italian male writers
19th-century Italian novelists
19th-century Italian poets
20th-century Italian novelists
20th-century Italian poets
Adriatic question
Dukes of Italy
Heads of state of states with limited recognition
Italian anti-communists
Italian aviators
Italian deists
Italian dramatists and playwrights
Italian essayists
Italian independence activists
Italian irredentism
Italian journalists
Italian-language poets
Italian male dramatists and playwrights
Italian male journalists
Italian male poets
Italian male non-fiction writers
Italian male novelists
Italian military personnel of World War I
Italian Nationalist Association
Italian nationalists
Italian princes
Italian revolutionaries
Italian World War I poets
Male essayists
Martinism
Members of the Académie royale de langue et de littérature françaises de Belgique
Members of the Grand Council of Fascism
Members of the Royal Academy of Italy
Olympic competitors in art competitions
People from Pescara
Proto-fascists
Sapienza University of Rome alumni
Symbolist novelists
Symbolist poets